Domenico Gianuzzi (1596–1680) was a Roman Catholic prelate who served as titular bishop of Dioclea in Phrygia (1669–1680).

Biography
Domenico Gianuzzi was born in 1596. On 2 December 1669, he was appointed during the papacy of Pope Clement IX as Titular Bishop of Dioclea (in Phrygia). On 18 May 1670, he was consecrated bishop by Pietro Vidoni, Cardinal-Priest of San Callisto, with Federico Baldeschi Colonna, Titular Archbishop of Caesarea in Cappadocia, and Francesco Maria Febei, Titular Archbishop of Tarsus, serving as co-consecrators. He served as Titular Archbishop of Teodosia until his death on 23 August 1680.

Episcopal succession

References 

17th-century Roman Catholic titular bishops
Bishops appointed by Pope Clement IX
1596 births
1680 deaths